Karel Mejta (born 2 July 1951 in Třeboň) was a Czech rower who competed for Czechoslovakia at world championships and in the 1976 and 1980 Summer Olympics. His father was Karel Mejta Sr.

References

1951 births
Living people
Czech male rowers
Czechoslovak male rowers
Olympic rowers of Czechoslovakia
Rowers at the 1976 Summer Olympics
Rowers at the 1980 Summer Olympics
World Rowing Championships medalists for Czechoslovakia
People from Třeboň
Sportspeople from the South Bohemian Region